The Uz is a right tributary of the river Trotuș in Romania. It discharges into the Trotuș in Dărmănești. The Poiana Uzului Dam is located on the river Uz.

Tributaries

The following rivers are tributaries to the river Uz (from source to mouth):

Left: Eghersec, Oreg, Rața, Soveto, Mogheruș, Copuria, Răchitiș, Câmp
Right: Bașca, Bărzăuța, Izvorul Alb, Groza, Tulburea, Izvorul Negru

References

Rivers of Romania
Rivers of Harghita County
Rivers of Bacău County